Maria Aurora, officially the Municipality of Maria Aurora, is the only landlocked and 2nd class municipality in the province of Aurora, Philippines. According to the 2020 census, it has a population of 44,958 people.

Despite being the only landlocked town of the province, it is the most populated municipality.

The Millennium Tree in Balete Park and the lush green landscape is Maria Aurora's main tourist asset.

History 
The town was named after Maria Aurora "Baby" Aragon Quezon, the first daughter of Philippine President Manuel L. Quezon and First Lady Aurora Aragon Quezon. Maria Aurora, along with her mother Aurora, was ambushed and assassinated by elements of the Hukbalahap movement in Nueva Ecija. The municipality of Maria Aurora was formed on July 21, 1949, through the Executive Order No. 246 out of various portions of the municipalities of Baler, then part of Quezon province.

The original settlers of the town now known as Maria Aurora were Bugkalot. These people are characterized as barbaric, wild and head hunters. They first established their settlement in an area known as “Egabong” (meaning muddy stream) and was considered at that time as “no man’s land”, since no Christian dared to enter the place for fear of beheading.

The arrival of a man from Liliw, Laguna named Jose Bitong  who was considered as the first Christian adventurer/settler, changed the course of event when he married a young Bugkalot lady and later won the admiration and confidence of the Bugkalots. From then, he became one of their dynamic leaders and was respected by the Bugkalot Tribe and Christians as well. This opened the gate for the Spanish missionaries to settle in the area and converted the settlers into Catholicism.

In 1896, a group of Ilocano settlers from Aringay, La Union  came to stay in the town, which was part of District of El Príncipe, Nueva Ecija. In 1906, another group of Ilocanos arrived from La Union and Pangasinan. Because of dominance of Ilocanos in Maria Aurora, Rang-ay Festival is celebrated, wherein rang-ay is an Ilocano word for progress. The word is distinctively chosen to confine the focus of celebration on the progressive vision of the people of Maria Aurora that are dominantly Ilocanos.

Proposal for the Municipality of Dr. Juan C. Angara 
A separate municipality called Dr. Juan C. Angara is being proposed under Senate Bill No. 3132 and House Bill No. 6518. San Juan will serve as poblacion or the seat of government.

Geography
According to the Philippine Statistics Authority, the municipality has a land area of  constituting  of the  total area of Aurora.

Maria Aurora is the only non-coastal municipality of the province. It is bounded by Baler and Dipaculao on the east, San Luis on the south, the Province of Nueva Ecija on the west and the Province of Nueva Vizcaya on the north-west; Maria Aurora is the only municipality of Aurora bordered by Nueva Vizcaya.

Barangays
Maria Aurora is politically subdivided into 40 barangays.

Climate

Demographics

In the 2020 census, Maria Aurora had a population of 44,958.

Economy

Government

List of mayors
Maria Aurora was administered by 12 mayors since its establishment in 1949.

 Mayor Aquilino Viernes Sr. (Jul 21, 1949 – Dec 31, 1951)
 Mayor Pedro S. Wenceslao (Jan 1, 1952 – Jun 21, 1958)
 Mayor Brigido E. Collado (Jun 22, 1958 – Dec 31, 1959)
 Mayor Leon B. Hulipas (Jan 1, 1960 – Dec 31, 1963)
 Mayor Leonardo T. Ong (Jan 1, 1964 – Aug 15, 1977)
 Mayor Juan R. Ortiz (Aug 16, 1977 – May 8, 1986)
 OJC Adriano C. Bitong (May 9, 1986 – Dec 1, 1987)
 OJC (LGO) Nepumuceno W. Gonzales (Dec 1, 1987 – Dec 15, 1987)
 Sec. Lorenzo O. Mangaoang (Dec. 16, 1987 – Feb 2, 1988)
 Mayor Adriano C. Bitong (Feb 3, 1988 – Jun 30, 1998)
 Mayor Brigido M. Noval (Jul 1, 1998 – Jun 30, 2004)
 Mayor Ariel S. Bitong (Jul 1, 2004 – Jun 30, 2013)
 Mayor Amado M. Geneta (Jul 1, 2013 – Present)

Transportation

Maria Aurora can be accessed by road through two routes: the Canili–Pantabangan Road, which passes Nueva Ecija's northern towns and through Alfonso Castañeda, Nueva Vizcaya; and the Nueva Ecija–Aurora Road, built on the 1940s that traverses the Sierra Madre Mountains and passes through the towns of Baler and San Luis. Today, the Canili–Pantabangan Road is much more commonly used, though it extends travel time for 1 hour, it is the safest route for vehicles. Originally, the Nueva Ecija–Aurora Road is the standard road for bus commuters, the shortest but the steep turns and unpaved roads makes it the most dangerous for heavy vehicles.

There are five bus lines that serve Maria Aurora's vicinity: Maria Aurora Express (PAPIN) (Cabanatuan–Dipaculao); D' Liner (Cabanatuan\Baguio - Maria Aurora, Casiguran; Genesis Bus Transport (Manila\Cabanatuan - Baler); - Aurora Bus Line (Cabanatuan - Baler) and Lizardo Transit (Baguio - Baler)

Healthcare
The Department of Health sustains health over the municipality. The municipality has 21 health centers and one provincial hospital, the Aurora Provincial Hospital located in barangay Buhangin in Baler, 30 kilometers south of the town.

Education
Maria Aurora has its education sustained by the Department of Education - Division of Aurora. The municipality has 38 public elementary and high schools with 1 central school (Maria Aurora Central School). Private institutions in the municipality include Mount Carmel School of Maria Aurora and Wesleyan University - Philippines (Aurora)

Maria Aurora National High School

Gallery

References

External links

 [ Philippine Standard Geographic Code]

Municipalities of Aurora (province)
Establishments by Philippine executive order